Louie Ocampo (born Jose Luis Ocampo on June 21, 1960) is a Filipino composer and arranger best known for his association with Martin Nievera. Regarded as one of the pillars and icons of Original Pilipino Music (OPM). His numerous hits, mostly collaborations, include Tell Me, Kahit Isang Saglit, Ewan, and You Are My Song.

Ocampo also created the theme song and music for various media, including:
Batibot, a children's television show
"Babalik Ka Rin", a theme song composed by himself with lyrics by Chot Ulep, performed by Gary Valenciano for Duty Free Philippines in 1994
Eat Bulaga!s 25th Anniversary in 2004
"Closer, You and I", used in the commercials of toothpaste Close Up, popularized by Gino Padilla
"Tell Me", a song originally performed by Joey Albert, also covered by Lea Salonga, Side A, Janet Arnaiz, Thalía, David Pomeranz, and a duet by Ariel Rivera and Regine Velasquez
"GMA Kapuso Jingle", a theme song of 2002 GMA Network Song performed by Regine Velasquez (1st version) and The Company (2nd version)
One of the musical directors of the month on SOP Rules
Arranger for the theme song of the film Felix Manalo, "Ang Sugo ng Diyos sa Mga Huling Araw".

He was currently one of the resident jurors of Pinoy Dream Academy Season II.

He is the original judge of Tawag ng Tanghalan then he came back to It's Showtime as a judge of Quarter 3 in Tawag ng Tanghalan.

Filmography

Film
As composer
Like Father, Like Son (1985)
Forever (1994)
Wanted: Perfect Mother (1996)
Lagarista (2000)
Home Along da Riber (2002)

Television
Ryan Ryan Musikahan (1988) as a Special Guest
Ikaw Lang ang Mamahalin (2001–2002)
Ikaw Lang ang Mamahalin (2011–2012)
24/SG (concert film, 2014)
Tawag ng Tanghalan (2016–present)
La Luna Sangre (2017–2018)
The Good Son (2017–2018)

Awards and nominations

References

External links

1960 births
Filipino OPM composers
Filipino pianists
Living people